For other uses, see Bolívar (disambiguation)

Bolivar Roads is a natural navigable strait fringed by Bolivar Peninsula and Galveston Island emerging as a landform on the Texas Gulf Coast.

The jetty harbor entrance originated in the 1890s as a preventative structure to inhibit the coastal sediment transport progressions by means of deviations with the continental margin and the Gulf Stream ocean current.

The Bolivar Roads channel tailors a nautical navigation gateway for Galveston Bay, Houston Ship Channel, Port of Galveston, and West Bay.

See also
Aframax
Cargo Ship Capacity
List of Panamax ports
Panamax

United States Maritime Environmental Law

Pictorial Biography

References

External links
 
 
 
 
 
 
 

Ports and harbors of Texas
Ship canals
Canals in Texas
Bodies of water of the Gulf of Mexico
Transportation in Galveston County, Texas